Asphyx is the third album by Asphyx. It was released by Century Media Records in 1994.

Track listing

Personnel
Asphyx
Sander van Hoof - drums
Eric Daniels - guitars
Ron van Pol - bass guitar/vocals
Heiko Hanke - keyboards
Tonny Brookhuis - lead guitar and intro on "Thoughts of an Atheist"

Production
Andy Classen - producer, mixing, engineering
Axel Hermann - cover art
R. Kampf - executive producer

(Note: Sander van Hoof is actually Roel Sanders (at the time also in Malignant together with Ron van Pol so they choose this "stage name")

References

Asphyx albums
1994 albums
Century Media Records albums